The Al-Wazeer Mosque is an old mosque in Baghdad, Iraq which considered a cultural heritage. The mosque was built by the Wazir of Baghdad Hasan Pasha in 1660 during the Ottoman era. Later the mosque had witnessed several renovation and restoration works. The main characteristic of the mosque is its Ottoman architectural style. It is located in Al-Rusafa neighborhood behind the Souq Al-Sarai, near the riverbank of Tigris. The mosque contains prayer space for more than 400 pilgrims. On the left side of the mosque, there is a round shaped minaret. Within the minaret, there is also a prayer space for more than 250 pilgrims. Attached garden extends to the riverbank of Tigris.

See also

 Islam in Iraq
 List of mosques in Iraq

References

17th-century mosques
Wazeer Mosque
Wazeer Mosque
Wazeer Mosque